is a Japanese mountain located on the border of Hino and Kōfu, Tottori. The area around the mountain was incorporated into as a part of Daisen-Oki National Park, in March 2002.

It has an elevation of 1,005 metres. 

This mountain is one of Chūgoku 100 mountains and Tottori 50 mountains.

Outline

Mount Hōbutsu is a typical monadic in Chūgoku Mountains. 

This mountain had been an object of worship for the people in this region.

Route

This mountain is a rare mountain which has easy access from a major railway station in San'in region.
 Neu Station of Hakubi Line.

Gallery

References
Official Home Page of the Geographical Survey Institute in Japan
Official Home Page of Hino Town

Hobutsu